Moreton Bay United FC is an Australian football (soccer) soccer club located in the northern Brisbane suburb of Albany Creek and representing the Moreton Bay Region of Queensland. The club was formed in 2012 and currently competes in the National Premier Leagues Queensland.

History
Moreton Bay United FC was established in 2012 with the aim of joining the new National Premier Leagues Queensland. The club was among the 12 successful applicants selected to compete in the inaugural 2013 season of NPL Queensland.

The club is associated with the Albany Creek Excelsior club and the two clubs share a home ground at Wolter Park, Albany Creek. In its initial season of competition, ACE players supplied between 50% and 80% of the players in Moreton Bay United's junior teams.

Moreton Bay United's most successful season to date has been the 2015 season when the club narrowly finished top of the NPL Queensland ladder, winning the premiership on goal difference ahead of Brisbane Strikers in a title race that went down to the last day of the season. Moreton Bay United went on to beat Brisbane Strikers 2-1 in the grand final to become champions. The club qualified for the 2015 National Premier Leagues finals, beating Edgeworth Eagles 3-1 in the quarter finals before losing 2-1 to eventual champions Blacktown City in the semi finals.

In 2017, Moreton Bay United reached the Round of 32 stage of the FFA Cup for the first time after a 4-2 win over Olympic FC in the final preliminary round. The club went on to defeat Broadmeadow Magic 4-2 in extra time in the Round of 32, but were then knocked out 1-0 in extra time by Gold Coast City in the Round of 16. In the 2017 NPL Queensland season Moreton Bay United scraped into the final four on the last day of the regular season, then won their semi-final 3-1 against premiers Brisbane Strkers, but narrowly lost the grand final 2-1 to Western Pride after conceding a goal in the 90th minute.

Moreton Bay United will continue in NPL Queensland after the 2017 season following an announcement by Football Queensland of the clubs selected to participate in the new two-tiered state competition starting in 2018.

Staff 
Current staff include:

Seasons

Source:

The tier is the level in the Australian soccer league system

Honours
NPL Queensland – Premiers and Champions 2015

References

External links
 

National Premier Leagues clubs
Soccer clubs in Queensland
2012 establishments in Australia
Association football clubs established in 2012
Moreton Bay Region